The pound was the currency of Southern Rhodesia. It also circulated in Northern Rhodesia and Nyasaland. The pound was subdivided into 20 shillings, each of 12 pence.

History

From 1896, private banks issued notes denominated in £sd equal to sterling. In 1932, a distinct coinage was introduced. In 1938, the Southern Rhodesia Currency Board was established and took over the issuance of paper money the following year. Southern Rhodesia, Northern Rhodesia and Nyasaland joined in 1953 to form the Federation of Rhodesia and Nyasaland, which continued to use the Southern Rhodesian pound until 1955 when coins were introduced for the Rhodesia and Nyasaland pound. 1955 also saw the Southern Rhodesia Currency Board renamed the Central Africa Currency Board. In 1956, the first paper money of the Rhodesia and Nyasaland pound was introduced, completing the transition.

Coins

In 1932, .925 fineness silver coins were introduced in denominations of 3d, 6d, 1/–, 2/–, and 2/6. These were followed in 1934 by holed, cupro-nickel d and 1d coins. In 1942, bronze replaced cupro-nickel, whilst the silver coins were debased to .500 fineness in 1944 and replaced by cupro-nickel in 1947. Coins were issued until 1954.  In 1953 a 5/– coin of .500 fineness (.45 ounce actual silver weight) was minted to commemorate the centennial of the birth of Cecil Rhodes.  124,000 were produced for circulation, plus 1500 minted as Proof coinage.

Banknotes

In 1896, the Salisbury branch of the Standard Bank of South Africa introduced the first Southern Rhodesian banknotes, in denominations of £1 and £5. This bank later issued 10/– notes. The Bank of Africa, Barclays Bank and the National Bank of South Africa also issued notes. These private bank issues ended in 1938.

In 1939, the Southern Rhodesia Currency Board introduced 10/–, £1 and £5 notes, followed by 5/– notes between 1943 and 1948 and £10 in 1953. In 1955, the Central Africa Currency Board issued notes in denominations of 10/–, £1, £5 and £10.

References

External links

|-

Currencies of Africa
Currencies of Rhodesia
Modern obsolete currencies
Currencies of the British Empire
Currencies of the Commonwealth of Nations
1940 establishments in Southern Rhodesia
1956 disestablishments in the Federation of Rhodesia and Nyasaland
Rhodesia
Northern Rhodesia
Nyasaland